Michal Dian (born 13 November 1981) is a Slovak football midfielder who currently plays for the Slovak Corgoň Liga club FK DAC 1904 Dunajská Streda, on loan from Spartak Myjava.

External links
Spartak Myjava profile
Bohemians 1905 profile

References

1981 births
Living people
Slovak footballers
Association football midfielders
FC Spartak Trnava players
Czech First League players
1. FK Příbram players
Bohemians 1905 players
FC Fastav Zlín players
FK Čáslav players
FC Hradec Králové players
Spartak Myjava players
FC DAC 1904 Dunajská Streda players
Slovak Super Liga players
Expatriate footballers in the Czech Republic
Expatriate footballers in Austria
Sportspeople from Trnava